Erythroseris is a genus of African plants in the tribe Cichorieae within the family Asteraceae.

 Species
 Erythroseris amabilis (Balf.f.) N.Kilian & Gemeinholzer - Socotra (part of Yemen)
 Erythroseris somalensis (R.E.Fr.) N.Kilian & Gemeinholzer - Somalia

References 

Cichorieae
Asteraceae genera